Fredrik Brattberg (born 30 October 1978) is a Norwegian playwright. His plays have been translated into twenty languages and staged world wide. 

In a portrait made by The Norwegian Broadcasting Corporation - NRK - it is written "In France, Germany and Czech Republic Brattberg is staged on the biggest theatres and described as a genius in the national newspapers". *
 
Brattberg has won The Ibsen Award and the Ferdinand Vanek Award. He has been nominated to Prix Godot and The Hedda Award.

References
 https://www.nrk.no/kultur/xl/fredrik-brattberg-blir-hylla-over-heile-verda-for-a-repetere-den-same-scena-igjen-og-igjen-1.16305737
http://www.ibsenawards.com/ia 
http://www.politiscopes.com

Norwegian dramatists and playwrights
Living people
1978 births